Antônio Eliseu Zuqueto (April 29, 1929 – August 23, 2016) was a Brazilian Roman Catholic bishop.

Ordained to the priesthood in 1955, Zuqueto served as bishop of the Roman Catholic Diocese of Teixeira de Freitas–Caravelas, Brazil, from 1983 to 2005.

See also
Roman Catholicism in Brazil

Notes

1929 births
2016 deaths
20th-century Roman Catholic bishops in Brazil
21st-century Roman Catholic bishops in Brazil
Roman Catholic bishops of Teixeira de Freitas–Caravelas